Patriarch Dionysius may refer to:

In the Syriac Orthodox Church:

 Patriarch Dionysius I Telmaharoyo, head of the Syriac Orthodox Church in 818–845

In the Church of Constantinople:

Dionysius I of Constantinople, Ecumenical Patriarch in 1466–1471 and 1488–1490
Dionysius II of Constantinople, Ecumenical Patriarch in 1546–1556
Dionysius III of Constantinople, Ecumenical Patriarch in 1662–1665
Dionysius IV of Constantinople, Ecumenical Patriarch in 1671–73, 1676–79, 1682–84, 1686–87, and 1693–94
Dionysius V of Constantinople, Ecumenical Patriarch in 1887–1891